Snigdha Akolkar is an Indian actress and model.

Career 
She appeared in Hindi television serials and more than 70 commercials, for Wildstone deodorant, Parachute, Lifebouy hand wash ad Westside.

She gathered fame by playing a Protagonist in daily soap Hare Kkaanch Ki Choodiyaan and other Tamil films. She is noted for her cameo song in Anjathe. She acted in Rajshri Production's Hindi film Love U...Mr. Kalakaar!. She appears in Vikram Bhatt's web series Zakhmi.

Filmography

Film

Television
2005 – Hare Kkaanch Ki Choodiyaan as Shyamlee 
2006 – Vaidehi as Janki
2014–2015 – Bandhan as Kajri Dev Patil
2015–2016 – Siya Ke Ram as Kaushalya
2017–2018 – Karmaphal Daata Shani as Anjani

References

Actresses in Tamil cinema
Indian film actresses
Living people
Female models from Maharashtra
21st-century Indian actresses
Actresses from Pune
Indian television actresses
Actresses in Hindi television
Actresses in Marathi television
Year of birth missing (living people)